Wang Fuzhou (1935 – 18 July 2015) was a Chinese mountaineer, born in Xihua County, Henan. He and Qu Yinhua were the first Chinese to climb Mount Everest on the northeast ridge route.

Wang graduated from the Beijing Institute of Geology in 1958. He was elected to the Chinese Mountaineering Team. On 25 May 1960, Wang Fuzhou, Qu Yinhua and Gongbu became the first to reach the summit of Mount Everest via the north face. Wang died in Beijing on 18 July 2015.

Notable ascents
1958 — Ibn Sina Peak
1959 — Muztagh Ata
1960 — Mount Everest (first ascent via the northeast ridge)
1964 — Shishapangma (first ascent)

See also
1960 Chinese Mount Everest expedition

References

1935 births
2015 deaths
Chinese mountain climbers
Chinese summiters of Mount Everest
Sportspeople from Henan
People from Zhoukou